Ian Watson Is a former ice hockey goaltender who played for the California Golden Bears before the team lost its varsity status in 1949.

Watson was the starting goaltender beginning in at least 1947–48 and was selected as the best college goaltender for that season. He repeated the performance the following year, but due to the demolition of their home rink in 1949, the team was shuttered. Watson does not appear to have played organized hockey since.

Awards and honors

References

External links
 

California Golden Bears men's ice hockey players
Canadian ice hockey goaltenders
Date of birth unknown
Ice hockey people from Calgary
AHCA Division I men's ice hockey All-Americans